Akbarabad-e Olya can refer to the following village in Iran:

 Akbarabad-e Olya, Lorestan
 Akbarabad-e Olya, Markazi

See also
 Akbarabad (disambiguation)